Tall Milak (also Romanized as Tall Mīlak and Tal-e Mīlak) is a village in Somghan Rural District, Chenar Shahijan District, Kazerun County, Fars Province, Iran. At the 2006 census, its population was 395, in 87 families.

References 

Populated places in Chenar Shahijan County